Nafis (also Romanized as Nafīs) is a village in Galehzan Rural District, in the Central District of Khomeyn County, Markazi Province, Iran. At the 2006 census, its population was 73, in 26 families.

References 

Populated places in Khomeyn County